Tommy Robinson may refer to:

Tommy Robinson (footballer) (1909–1982), English footballer of the 1930s
Tommy F. Robinson (born 1942), American politician from Arkansas
Tommy Robinson (activist) (born 1982), British far-right anti-Islam activist
Tommy Robinson (hooligan), British football hooligan
Tommy Robinson, British actor in Jonny Briggs

See also
Thomas Robinson (disambiguation)
Tommy Robison (born 1961), American football player
Thomas Robson (disambiguation)
Thomas Robbins (disambiguation)